The lightweight boxing competition at the 2004 Summer Olympics in Athens was held from 16 to 29 August at Peristeri Olympic Boxing Hall. This is limited to those boxers weighing between 57 and 60 kilograms.

Competition format
Like all Olympic boxing events, the competition was a straight single-elimination tournament. This event consisted of 28 boxers who have qualified for the competition through various tournaments held in 2003 and 2004. The competition began with a preliminary round on 16 August, where the number of competitors was reduced to 16, and concluded with the final on 29 August. As there were fewer than 32 boxers in the competition, a number of boxers received a bye through the preliminary round. Both semi-final losers were awarded bronze medals.

All bouts consisted of four rounds of two minutes each, with one-minute breaks between rounds. Punches scored only if the white area on the front of the glove made full contact with the front of the head or torso of the opponent. Five judges scored each bout; three of the judges had to signal a scoring punch within one second for the punch to score. The winner of the bout was the boxer who scored the most valid punches by the end of the bout.

Schedule 
All times are Greece Standard Time (UTC+2)

Qualifying Athletes

Results

References

External links
 Official Olympic Report

Light
Amir Khan (boxer)